Telphusa nigrifasciata is a moth of the family Gelechiidae. It is found in South Korea.

The wingspan is 14–17 mm. The forewings are ochreous-grey with a dark grey basal fascia, extended to the base on the costa. There are two scale tufts anteriorly, with a yellowish-white scale tuft beyond it. There is also a dark grey costal patch, with several scale tufts with yellow margins parallel to this.

References

Moths described in 1992
Telphusa